Intelcystiscus gordonmoorei is a species of very small sea snail, a marine gastropod mollusk or micromollusk in the family Cystiscidae.

References

gordonmoorei
Gastropods described in 2001
Cystiscidae